Chinoy may refer to
Chinese Filipino
CHInoyTV, a weekly television program in the Philippines
Chinoy (surname)
Chinoy (musician) (born Castillo Moya  in 1982), Chilean singer-songwriter